Lyhoalepis duckhoai is an arthrodire placoderm fish, which lived during the Early Devonian period in what is now Central Vietnam.  Its fossils are found in the Emsian-aged Ly Hoa Formation.

References

Phlyctaeniidae
Placoderms of Asia